Y Groes Fagl is a top of Cyrniau Nod in north east Wales. It forms a part of the Berwyn range known as the Hirnantau. Its summit has the Snowdonia National Park boundary located just to the east of it.

The views from the summit are extensive, if unremarkable due to the featureless, flat moorland surroundings.  The summit is marked by a post. To the north, the ridge continues to Foel Cwm Sian Llwyd.

References

Llangywer
Mountains and hills of Gwynedd
Mountains and hills of Powys
Mountains and hills of Snowdonia
Nuttalls